HMS Warwick (D25) was an Admiralty W-class destroyer built in 1917. She saw service in both the First and Second World Wars, before being torpedoed and sunk in February 1944.

Construction and design
On 9 December 1916, the British Admiralty placed an order for 21 large destroyers based on the V class, which became the Admiralty W class.

Warwicks main gun armament consisted of four 4-inch Mk V QF guns in four single mounts on the ship's centerline.  These were disposed as two forward and two aft in superimposed firing positions.  A single QF 3-inch (76 mm) 20 cwt anti-aircraft gun was mounted aft of the second funnel.  Aft of the 3-inch gun, she carried six 21-inch torpedo tubes mounted in two triple mounts on the center-line. Warwick was one of 13 V and W-class destroyers converted for minelaying during the First World War, with rails for up to 66 mines fitted.

Warwick was laid down at Leslie's Hebburn shipyard on 10 March 1917. She was launched on 28 December 1917 and completed 18 March 1918.

Service history

First World War

Warwick commissioned on 21 February 1918, joining the Sixth Destroyer Flotilla, part of the Dover Patrol, seeing action in the last months of the First World War. She took part in the raid on Zeebrugge on the night of 22/23 April, the attempt by the RN to blockade Germany's U-boat force stationed in Flanders, acting as flagship of Vice-Admiral Roger Keyes. Warwick help to lay smoke screens to cover the assault forces, and then covered the withdrawal of the small craft carrying the survivors of the crews of the block ships. She also participated in the second raid on Ostend on 10 May, again serving as Keyes' flagship. As the force withdrew, Warwick came alongside the badly damaged Motor Launch ML254, packed with survivors of the blockship  and took off the survivors from the blockship and the crew of ML 245, before scuttling the Motor Launch.

Warwick was present at Scapa Flow in November 1918 when the Grand Fleet received the surrender of the German High Seas Fleet at the end of the war.

Inter-war years
Following the completion of repairs from mine damage, Warwick recommissioned into the 14th Destroyer Flotilla on 12 January 1919. In March 1919, the Royal Navy's destroyer forces were reorganised, with Warwick joining the new First Destroyer Flotilla, operating as part of the Atlantic Fleet. From 25 June to 18 August 1919, Warwick was deployed to the Baltic Sea as part of the British Baltic campaign during the Russian Civil War, and returned again from 7 November to 30 December 1919. In 1921, the destroyer forces of the Royal Navy were again reorganised, changing from flotillas of a leader and 16 destroyers to flotillas of one leader and eight destroyers, as the 17-ship flotillas were too large to easily manage. Warwick remained part of the new, smaller First Destroyer flotilla. In June 1922, Warwick carried out patrols on Lough Foyle, between Northern Ireland and the Republic of Ireland, stopping a steamer, the Cragbue, on passage from Moville to Londonderry Port, so that police could search the ship and her passengers. On 26 September 1922, as the Chanak Crisis threatened war between Britain and Turkey, the First Destroyer Flotilla, including Warwick, left England for the Mediterranean, arriving at Çanakkale on 4 October, remaining there until March 1923. On 26 June 1924, Warwick took part in the Fleet Review at Spithead by King George V, leading the First Destroyer Flotilla in the absence of the normal leader .

In January 1926, Warwick recommissioned into the 5th Destroyer Flotilla. In June–July 1929, the 5th Destroyer Flotilla, including Warwick accompanied the 2nd Cruiser Squadron on a tour of the Baltic. In January 1931, Warwick was ordered to replace  in the 6th Destroyer Flotilla, but on 30 March 1931, she re-entered reserve at Sheerness, and underwent a refit during which her boilers were retubed from August 1931 to January 1932. After this refit, Warwick recommissioned into the 5th Destroyer Flotilla. In October 1934, Warwick was replaced in the 5th Flotilla by the newly completed destroyer , and after being refitted at Devonport between 22 October and 9 November that year, went into reserve at Devonport. With the onset of war in 1939 Warwick was re-activated, re-commissioning in August, and joining the fleet at Plymouth in September.

Second World War
During World War II Warwick served as a convoy escort, being too outdated for modern destroyer work. In September 1939 was allocated to the 11th Destroyer Flotilla. In February 1940 she was deployed to the Western Approaches Escort Force for Atlantic convoy defence. In this role she was engaged in all the duties performed by escort ships; protecting convoys, searching for and attacking U-boats which attacked ships in convoy, and rescuing survivors. In November 1940, with the formation of distinct escort groups, she joined 7 EG.
In December she was mined and spent the next four months in dock for repairs.

In March 1941 she rejoined Western Approaches Command and saw out the year in the Atlantic. In January 1942, following the US entry into the war and the opening of the U-boat offensive off the US east coast (Operation Drumbeat), Warwick transferred there, on loan to the United States Navy (USN). In June 1942 she was transferred to the West Indies serving with USN and Royal Canadian Navy (RCN) ships of the Caribbean Escort Force on anti-submarine patrol and convoy escort duty.

In December Warwick returned to Britain for conversion as a long-range escort. This entailed, among other modifications, the removal of one of her boilers to allow extra fuel capacity, thus sacrificing speed for endurance and range. She remained in dock at Dundee for the first half of 1943 while this was carried out.

In July she was on anti-submarine duties in the Bay of Biscay, supporting Operation Musketry, the Royal Air Force Coastal Command's Bay offensive. In November she took part in Operation Alacrity, the establishment and supply of Allied air bases in the Azores which served to close the Mid-Atlantic gap.

In January 1944, having returned to Britain, Warwick was assigned to lead an escort group operating in the Southwest Approaches, guarding against attacks by German S-boats and submarines. On 19 February 1944, Warwick, under the command of Commander Denys Rayner, and the destroyer  were ordered from Devonport to hunt a submarine that had been reported near Trevose Head. Warwick sank in minutes, after her after engine room bulkhead collapsed. Sixty-seven of Warwicks crew were killed, with 93 survivors being rescued.

Notes

References

Bibliography
 
 
 
 
 
 
 
 
 
 
 
 
 
 
 
 
 
 Rayner, Denys : Escort:The Battle of the Atlantic 1955 (reprinted 1999)

External links
  HMS Warwick at naval-history.net
 HMS Warwick at uboatnet

 

V and W-class destroyers of the Royal Navy
Ships built on the River Tyne
1917 ships
World War I destroyers of the United Kingdom
World War II destroyers of the United Kingdom
Maritime incidents in December 1940
Maritime incidents in February 1944
Ships sunk by German submarines in World War II
World War II shipwrecks in the Atlantic Ocean